Saco may refer to:


Geography

Brazil 
 Saco River (Maranhão), Maranhão state
 Saco River (Paracauari), Pará state

Mozambique 
 Saco Bay (Mozambique)

United States 
 Saco, Alabama, an unincorporated community
 Saco, California, an unincorporated community
 Saco, Georgia, an unincorporated community
 Saco, Maine, a city
 Saco Bay (Maine)
 Saco River, Maine and New Hampshire
 Saco, Minnesota, an unincorporated community
 Saco, Missouri, an unincorporated community
 Saco, Montana, a town
 Saco, Ceiba, Puerto Rico, a barrio in the municipality of Ceiba

People 
 José Antonio Saco (1797–1879), Cuban-born deputy to the Spanish Cortes, writer, social critic, publicist, essayist, anthropologist and historian
 Saco Rienk de Boer (1883–1974), Dutch-born American landscape architect
 Saco Reinalda (died 1167), potestaat of Friesland

Other uses 
 , three US Navy vessels

See also
 SACO (disambiguation)
 Saco River (disambiguation)
 Sacco (disambiguation)

Dutch masculine given names